Scott Lyster (born  January 22, 1987) is a Canadian actor.

Career 
In 2010 he played Randy Jackson, sheriff's son, in Psych episode Dual Spires. In 2012, he starred as Richie in the indie film Locked in a Garage Band and in 2016 played Nelson in psychological horror film The Unseen.

He also portrayed Perry Dell in Hallmark Movies & Mysteries TV-films series The Aurora Teagarden Mysteries, based on Charlaine Harris crime novels.

Filmography

Film

Television

The Aurora Teagarden Mysteries

References

External links

1987 births
Canadian male film actors
Canadian male television actors
Living people
Male actors from Vancouver